Boea hygroscopica (known as rock violet) is one of 15 species of flowering plant of the Boea genus in the gesneriad family. It is considered a 'resurrection plant' because of its ability to withstand virtually total water loss. Detached leaves of B. hydroscopica can withstand desiccation by increasing the small amount of constitutive glutathione by up to 50 times.

It is endemic to Queensland, Australia and is found growing along creek beds, on moist banks and moss-covered rocks in rainforest, open forest, vine forest and gallery forest.

Description

Gallery

References

Didymocarpoideae
Taxa named by Ferdinand von Mueller